TVA Vicenza is an Italian regional television channel of Veneto owned by Videomedia Spa group. It transmits a light entertainment program: movies, news and weather bulletins, political debates and sports on LCN 10.

Other channels of own group are Tva Sport, TVA News, Terra Veneta and TVA +1.

It is also broadcast Free To Air on Hot Bird satellite in Europe and Africa.

Programming 
 TvA Notizie (Vicenza News)
 Bassano Notizie (Bassano del Grappa news)
 TG Alto Vicentino (Thiene and Schio news)
 Ginnastica per la Terza Età (Gymnastics)
 Vicenza Calcio match
 Sportivamente Domenica (Sports Sunday)
 Rigorosamente calcio (football)
 Santa Messa
 Dolomiti Doc
 Super Pass
 Miss Vicenza
 Vicenza Splash
 Novastadio

References

External links 
 TVA Vicenza Live Streaming
 Official Site 

Television channels in Italy
Television channels and stations established in 1978
Free-to-air
Italian-language television networks